Lunezhki is a rural locality (a village) in Dobryansky District, Perm Krai, Russia. The population was 62 as of 2010. There are 2 streets.

Geography 
Lunezhki is located 20 km southeast of Dobryanka (the district's administrative centre) by road. Gory is the nearest rural locality.

References 

Rural localities in Dobryansky District